Skonto Hall (also known as Skonto Arena) is an arena in Riga, Latvia. In the lobby of Skonto there are conference halls, a gym, and an arena with an artificial football field, which also hosts numerous exhibitions and concerts. The multi-purpose hall was originally built in 1996 and can accommodate either 2,000 seated spectators or 8,000 standing spectators. It is immediately adjacent to Skonto Stadium.

History
 
Skonto Hall was renovated in early 2006, so that it could be used as one of the venues for the 2006 Men's World Ice Hockey Championships alongside the newly built Arēna Rīga. The hall also played host to the Eurovision Song Contest 2003, with a maximum capacity of 6,500.

After the World Ice Hockey Championships, the arena was the home of Riga basketball club BK Skonto Riga, but it is also used as a conference and congress center.

Due to outstanding loan payments, the hall was taken over by asset management company Reverta in 2011. On 15 October 2013, an auction which included the stadium was planned. At the auction, however, the property was not sold, but on 15 July 2014 it was acquired by SIA "SSA Assets".

See also
Skonto Stadium
List of indoor arenas in Latvia

References

External links

  

Buildings and structures in Riga
Indoor arenas in Latvia
Indoor ice hockey venues in Latvia
Basketball venues in Latvia
1996 establishments in Latvia
Sports venues completed in 1996